JJY is the call sign of a low frequency time signal radio station located in Japan.

The station broadcasts from two sites, one on Mount Otakadoya, near Fukushima, and the other on Mount Hagane, located on Kyushu Island. JJY is operated by the National Institute of Information and Communications Technology (NICT), an independent administrative institution affiliated with the Ministry of Internal Affairs and Communications of the Japanese government.

Transmission sites 
The Mount Otakadoya site is located at an elevation of 790 meters (2,590 ft) in Fukushima Prefecture. It broadcasts a 50 kW signal (13 kW ERP) on 40 kHz from an umbrella top-loading antenna situated 250 meters (820 ft) above the ground. In March 2011, it was powered down and evacuated due to its proximity to the Fukushima Daiichi nuclear disaster. It resumed broadcasting on April 21, unattended by staff. It went off air again temporarily on April 25 due to lightning, but has ever since been on air.

The Mount Hagane site is located at an elevation of 900 meters (2,950 ft) in Saga Prefecture. It broadcasts a 50 kW signal (23 kW ERP) on 60 kHz to avoid interfering with the Otakadoya site as their signals overlap. The antenna for the Hagane site is also an umbrella top loading antenna and is situated 200 meters (650 ft) above the ground. This site does not have a redundant 40 kHz transmitter, so cannot act as a fallback for the Mount Otakadoya site.

Time standards 
Both carrier signals contain an identical pulse-width modulated time code and are transmitted 24 hours a day.  Low frequency (LF) transmissions are used to enhance accuracy and reduce the possibility of atmospheric interference. The calculated accuracy of JJY's signal is 1×10−11.

Japan Standard Time is set by a caesium atomic clock in Tokyo. This information is sent to the transmitter stations and is used to set a caesium atomic clock at each station. These clocks are housed in an environmentally controlled and electromagnetically shielded room to prevent outside interference with the clocks.

The time code format is very similar to that of WWVB in the United States but technically is a variant of IRIG. Similarly to WWVB or MSF the signal of JJY is used to synchronize consumer radio-controlled clocks sold throughout Japan.

Transmission systems 
Each station has an identical setup of equipment. A dual set of transmitters, a primary and a backup, provide for constant transmission of the time code. However, it is not possible given the current design configuration for one site to act as a lower power alternate frequency backup for the other. The backups are set to automatically take over in the event that the primary transmission system has a failure. The Time Signal Control Room generates the standard LF signal and time code that is broadcast.

The Impedance Matching Room has a matching transformer to perform impedance matching between the transmitter and the antenna. Due to the high power of radio frequency signals that pass through the room, it is completely shielded in copper and is off-limits during broadcasts.

History and former shortwave station
On January 30, 1940, the Communications Research Laboratory (the predecessor of NICT), began operations of JJY as a shortwave station, broadcasting at 4, 7, 9, and 13 MHz. Over the years, these were dropped and by the late 1950s, JJY was transmitting its time signal on standard frequencies of 2.5, 5, 8, 10, and 15 MHz. The 2.5 and 15 MHz broadcasts terminated in 1996. The time signals included announcements of the time, in both Morse code and by a female voice, before every tenth minute: for example, "JJY JJY 1630 JST" (the voice announcement of the time being in Japanese).

Experimental station JG2AS began broadcasting on January 10, 1966, providing digitally encoded time signals in the longwave band at 40 kHz. In 1997, the CRL, determining that the longwave time signal was more accurate when received, subject to less interference, and in wider use than the shortwave time signal, decided to construct a new longwave time station and gradually eliminate the shortwave broadcasts. The first official longwave station of JJY began broadcasting from Mount Otakadoya at 40 kHz on June 10, 1999, and the shortwave broadcasts finally ceased operation on March 31, 2001. On October 1, 2001, the 60 kHz longwave transmission from Mount Hagane began.

The Mount Otakadoya transmitter survived the 2011 Tōhoku earthquake and tsunami, but is 17 km from the Fukushima I nuclear accidents, and was powered down when it was evacuated on March 12 (19:46 JST) due to the 20 km radius evacuation order. It was re-enabled April 21.

JJY Time Code
As with most longwave time code stations, the JJY signal is amplitude-modulated to send one bit per second, transmitting a complete time code every minute.

The time code is most similar to that transmitted by WWVB, but each bit is reversed: on the second, the carrier is increased to full power. Some time during the second (depending on the bit to be transmitted), the carrier is reduced by 10 dB, to 10% power, until the beginning of the next second.

There are three different signals that are sent each second:
 0 bits consist of 0.8 s of full power, followed by 0.2 s of reduced power.
 1 bits consist of 0.5 s of full power, followed by 0.5 s of reduced power.
 Marker bits consist of 0.2 s of full power, followed by 0.8 s of reduced power.

As with WWVB, seconds 0, 9, 19, 29, 39, 49 and 59 of each minute are marker bits. The remaining 53 encode Japan Standard Time using binary-coded decimal. JST does not include summer time, but bits are reserved to handle it. Leap second warning bits are also provided, these announce leap seconds starting at the beginning of the UTC month (09:00 JST on the first day of the month), and ending with the leap second insertion (just after 08:59 JST on the first day of the following month).

The full-time code is as follows:

The first 35 seconds are identical to WWVB, but after that it diverges, including some parity and day-of-week bits not in WWVB, and omitting DUT1 information.

P0 is always the last second of a minute. In the event of a leap second, an additional 0 bit is inserted before it, and the marker bit is transmitted during second 60. LS1 and LS2 are normally both 0. Both bits are set to announce an inserted leap second at the end of the current UTC month.

Twice per hour (minutes 15 and 45), the last 20 seconds of the time code are different. In lieu of the year bits, the station's call sign is broadcast in Morse code twice using on-off keying during seconds 40 through 48. Further, bits 50 through 55 are replaced by 6 status bits ST1 through ST6 which, if non-zero, indicate a scheduled service interruption:

ST1 through ST3 indicate the time of the planned service interruption:

ST4, if set, promises the service interruption will be during daylight hours only.  If unset, the interruption may be all day.

ST5 and ST6 indicate the duration of the interruption:

If no interruption is planned, all ST bits are 0.

References

External links

 Japan Standard Time Group
 Coordinates of Mount Otakadoya transmitter: 
 Coordinates of Mount Hagane transmitter: 

Radio stations established in 1940
Radio stations established in 2001
1940 establishments in Japan
2001 establishments in Japan
Time signal radio stations
Radio in Japan
Mass media in Fukushima Prefecture